Basil Swyer (6 June 1898 — 7 July 1964) was an English cricketer who played for Essex. He was born in West Ham and died in Sherwood, Nottingham.

Swyer made a single first-class appearance, in a County Championship match in 1923 against Kent, in which he bowled thirteen overs in a match which saw centuries from Kent pair Wally Hardinge and James Seymour. His efforts with both bat and ball were unspectacular, and he was immediately dropped from the team.

External links
Basil Swyer at Cricket Archive 

1898 births
1964 deaths
English cricketers
Essex cricketers
People from West Ham
People from Sherwood, Nottingham
Cricketers from Nottinghamshire